Prapawadee Jaroenrattanatarakoon (born Junpim Kuntatean, ; , also transliterated Chanpim Kantatian May 29, 1984) is a weightlifter from Thailand.

At the 2005 World Weightlifting Championships she won the silver medal in the 53 kg category, lifting a total of 223 kg (491.6 lbs). At the 2006 University World Championships she won the gold medal in the 53 kg category.

During the 2007 World Weightlifting Championships she suffered an elbow injury, and had to rest for three months.

She won the women's 53 kg class at the Beijing 2008 Summer Olympics.  She changed her name in 2007 on the advice of a fortune teller who said it would improve her chances of winning the Olympics. Her name was so long that it was listed as "J" on the digital scoreboard during the Beijing Games.

Major results
She competed at world championships, most recently at the 2009 World Weightlifting Championships.

References

External links
 
 
 
 
 
 

1984 births
Living people
Weightlifters at the 2008 Summer Olympics
Prapawadee Jaroenrattanatarakoon
Prapawadee Jaroenrattanatarakoon
Olympic medalists in weightlifting
Asian Games medalists in weightlifting
Weightlifters at the 2002 Asian Games
Weightlifters at the 2006 Asian Games
Weightlifters at the 2010 Asian Games
Medalists at the 2008 Summer Olympics
Prapawadee Jaroenrattanatarakoon
World Weightlifting Championships medalists
Prapawadee Jaroenrattanatarakoon
Prapawadee Jaroenrattanatarakoon
Medalists at the 2006 Asian Games
Medalists at the 2010 Asian Games
Prapawadee Jaroenrattanatarakoon
Southeast Asian Games medalists in weightlifting
Competitors at the 2011 Southeast Asian Games
Prapawadee Jaroenrattanatarakoon